The 1964 Intercontinental Cup was an association football tie in September 1964 between Independiente and Inter Milan.

The first leg was held on 9 September 1964 in Avellaneda, and won 1–0 by Independiente. Two weeks later, Inter won the return leg, 2-0. A playoff was therefore held, at Santiago Bernabéu Stadium, Madrid, with Inter winning in extra time with a goal from Mario Corso.

Qualified teams

Venues

Match details

First leg

Second leg

Play-off

References

1964–65 in European football
1964 in South American football
1964
Club Atlético Independiente matches
Inter Milan matches
1964 in Argentine football
1964–65 in Italian football
Sports competitions in Milan
1960s in Milan
Sports competitions in Madrid
1960s in Madrid
September 1964 sports events in Europe
September 1964 sports events in South America
Football in Avellaneda